This is a list of Peruvian steam frigates of the period 1852-1881:

Peruvian steam
Steam
Peruvian